Noura Erakat (born ) is an American activist, university professor, legal scholar, and human rights attorney. She is currently an associate professor at Rutgers University, specializing in international studies. With her primary focus being the Israeli–Palestinian conflict, she is a vocal critic of the State of Israel.

Education and career 
Noura Erakat was born on January 16, 1980, in Alameda County, California. She attended the University of California, Berkeley and graduated with a baccalaureate in 2002, was a member of Phi Beta Kappa, and was named a UC-Berkeley Human Rights Center Summer Fellow in 2003. In 2005, she received her Juris Doctor from the UC Berkeley School of Law and was awarded the Francine Diaz Memorial Scholarship Award. She completed her L.L.M at Georgetown University Law Center in 2012.

In 2010 she was a co-founder of Jadaliyya, an online magazine published in English, Arabic, and French, and which is affiliated with the non-profit Arab Studies Institute, operating in Washington, D.C. and Beirut.

Erakat has served as "legal counsel to the House of Representatives Oversight Committee" and has previously taught at Georgetown University. From 2012–2014, she was a Freedman Fellow with Temple University Beasley School of Law. Erakat also has taught international studies at George Mason University at Fairfax, Virginia. She is currently an associate professor at Rutgers University.

She currently serves on the board of the Institute for Policy Studies and serves as an associate professor at Rutgers University, is a member of the Board of Directors for the Trans-Arab Research Institute, and is a policy advisor with Al-Shabaka: The Palestinian Policy Network.

Personal life 
She is the sister of Yousef Erakat, better known by his YouTube moniker, FouseyTube.

In June 2020, Erakat's cousin Ahmed's car collided with a military checkpoint in the West Bank near Abu Dis, following which he was shot and killed by Israeli soldiers. The officers justified their actions as self-defense, saying that Ahmed attempted to ram his car into them, but Noura has disputed this. Forensic Architecture and Al-Haq launched an investigation into the killing of Ahmed using 3D modeling, fieldwork, geolocation, synchronization, OSINT, and shadow analysis, and concluded that the car's collision with the checkpoint was an accident, that the Israeli shooting constituted an extrajudicial killing and excessive use of lethal force, and that the Israeli military had denied Ahmed urgent medical care.

Selected works

Academic books 
Aborted State? The UN Initiative and New Palestinian Junctures. Co-edited with Mouin Rabbani, 2013.
Justice for Some: Law and the Question of Palestine. 2019.

Academic papers 
"Palestinian Refugees and the Syrian Uprising: Filling the Protection Gap During Secondary Forced Displacement." Oxford Journal of International Refugee Law, Forthcoming.
"New Imminence in the Time of Obama: The Impact of Targeted Killings on the Law of Self Defense." Arizona Law Review, Forthcoming.
"The US v. The Red Cross: Customary International Humanitarian Law & Universal Jurisdiction." Denver Journal of International Law and Policy 41 Denv. J. Int'l L. & Pol'y 225 (Winter 2013).
"It's Not Wrong, It's Illegal: Situating the Gaza Blockade Between International Law and the UN Response." UCLA Journal of Islamic and Near Eastern Law, Vol. 11, No. 37, 2011–2012.
"Operation Cast Lead: The Elusive Quest for Self-Defense in International Law." 36 Rutgers L. Rec. 164 (2009).
"Litigating the Arab-Israeli Conflict: The Politicization of U.S. Federal Courtrooms." 2 Berkeley Journal of Middle Eastern & Islamic Law 27 (2009).

Print media 
"U.S. Should Stop Funding Israel, or Let Others Broker Peace." New York Times, August 5, 2014.
"Israeli operation not about security: Opposing view." USA Today, July 31, 2014.
"Five Israeli Talking Points on Gaza—Debunked." The Nation, July 25, 2014.
"Structural Violence on Trial: BDS and the Movement to Resist Erasure." Los Angeles Review of Books, March 16, 2014.

Interviews

Radio 
Israel's greatest threats are internal, not Hamas or Iran, says former prime minister Ehud Barak CBC, June 5, 2018
To The Point: "A New Shot at Peace Talks: Will it be Different this Time?"  KCRW, July 31, 2013.
Beyond Beijing: "Palestine seeking statehood bid in UN." China Radio International, November 21, 2012.

Video 
"Gaza in context.", gazaincontext.com, July 2016.
"Debating the tactics and ethics of warfare on both sides of Mideast conflict." PBS NewsHour, July 24, 2014.
"Gaza Debate: As Palestinian Deaths Top 100, Who's to Blame for Escalating Violence? What Can Be Done?." Democracy Now!,  July 11, 2014.
Up With Chris Hayes: "Obama wraps up first trip to Israel as president." MSNBC, March 22, 2013.
Up With Chris Hayes: "What sparked escalation of violence in Israel and Gaza." MSNBC, November 17, 2012.
"The Law in These Parts: A Discussion." WNET (PBS Thirteen)

Notes

External links 

 Biography – George Mason University
 

1980 births
Living people
American legal scholars
George Mason University faculty
University of California, Berkeley alumni
Georgetown University Law Center alumni
American people of Palestinian descent
American women writers
Palestinian women writers
Palestinian human rights activists
Human rights lawyers
UC Berkeley School of Law alumni
21st-century Palestinian women writers
21st-century Palestinian writers
American women legal scholars
American women academics
Erekat family
21st-century American women